Félix Mantilla was the defending champion but did not compete that year.

Fernando González won in the final 5–7, 6–3, 6–1 against José Acasuso.

Seeds
A champion seed is indicated in bold text while text in italics indicates the round in which that seed was eliminated.

  Marcelo Ríos (semifinals)
  Fernando González (champion)
  José Acasuso (final)
  Fernando Vicente (first round)
  David Ferrer (second round)
  David Sánchez (quarterfinals)
  Alberto Martín (quarterfinals)
 n/a

Draw

External links
 2002 Campionati Internazionali di Sicilia draw

Campionati Internazionali di Sicilia
2002 ATP Tour
Camp